Mordecai Leib Bisliches (1786–1851) was an Austrian bibliophile and rabbinic scholar.

Bisliches was born in Brody at the end of the eighteenth century. He was married at the age of thirteen, ultimately divorced his wife, and, after the death of his children, went to Paris. There he was very prosperous in business, devoting his leisure to the study and publication of Hebrew manuscripts in the Paris Library. Later he went to Holland and Italy, where he collected a number of Hebrew manuscripts. Returning to his birthplace, he prepared for publication a number of works with the aid of his brother Ephraim.

In 1846 Bisliches and  sold 111 manuscripts in 102 volumes to the Archduchess Marie Louise of Parma, which were added to the De Rossi Collection in the Biblioteca Palatina.

Publications
 
 
 
 
  Ḥiddushim on Shabbat.
 
  Edited with preface by Meïr Letteris.
  Catalogue of eighty valuable Hebrew manuscripts in the possession of Bisliches (described by L. Zunz, with additional critical remarks by Senior Sachs).

References

External links
 
 

1786 births
1851 deaths
Austrian Empire Jews
Austrian Hebraists
Book and manuscript collectors
Jewish scholars